Perfumes: The Guide is part of a series of books cataloguing major perfumes, written by Luca Turin and Tania Sanchez.

Authors

Luca Turin and Tania Sanchez co-authored The Guide. The couple are married; he is a biophysicist and she is a perfume critic.

Perfumes: The Guide and Perfumes: The A-Z Guide
In 2008 Turin and Sanchez published Perfumes: The Guide. It began with introductory chapters on the basics of perfumery and then reviewed more than a thousand perfumes, giving a rating of one to five stars and a brief critical review, signed either LT or TS. These ranged from a single word (Sanchez on Lanvin Rumeur: "Baseless") to a few paragraphs.

In 2009, they published a paperback edition, titled Perfumes: The A-Z Guide, that made some expansions, adding 451 new reviews and new Top 10 lists.

Perfumes: The Guide 2018 and reissue of The A-Z Guide

In 2018, Turin and Sanchez released a new volume, Perfumes: The Guide 2018, covering 1200 fragrances that had been released in the 10 years since the first book. In 2019, they reissued Perfumes: The A-Z Guide.

Reception
The Guide received a starred review in Publishers Weekly, which said, “The book brings [the authors'] exquisite connoisseurship to life in a contagious manner. Their passion for a few scents and their outrage at the others' failings make for entry after entry of hilarious, catty comments interspersed with occasional erudite, eloquent disquisitions." Other reviewers echoed the praise for the book’s prose. In The Guardian, Hermione Hoby wrote, “Convincing the reader that perfume-making is an art form is easy for these authors: the real joy of this husband and wife's dazzlingly comprehensive compendium is in its case for perfume criticism as the even greater art." Likewise in Maclean's, Anne Kingston wrote, "Perfumes' metaphorically brilliant descriptors often qualify as art themselves." In The New Yorker, John Lancaster wrote that the authors "offer vivid, funny, evocative descriptions of the smells they write about…To enjoy "Perfumes," you don't need to know, or even to like, perfumes, such is the brio of Turin's and Sanchez's prose."

See also
 Fragrance wheel

Bibliography

References

External links 
  Perfumes : The Guide 2018 web site

2008 non-fiction books